Cruel Summer is an American teen drama thriller anthology series created by Bert V. Royal. The first season follows two teenage girls in the 1990s and the repercussions on everyone's lives after one disappears and the other seemingly takes her place.

The series premiered on Freeform on April 20, 2021. In June 2021, the series was renewed for a second season, which is scheduled to premiere in June 2023 at the ATX Television Festival.

Overview
Set in the fictional town of Skylin, Texas, each episode focuses on the same day over the course of three years: 1993, 1994, and 1995. The series follows two teenage girls: Kate Wallis is a beloved popular girl who one day disappears without a trace at the hands of new vice-principal Martin Harris. Jeanette Turner is a socially awkward teenager who blossoms after Kate's disappearance as she takes over certain aspects of Kate's social life. Found alive a year later, Kate accuses Jeanette of witnessing her abduction but not reporting it, which results in Jeanette becoming the most despised person in the United States. Through a protracted legal battle and fractured families, friendships and relationships, everyone scrambles to pick sides as the true story unfolds. With all the rumors and no one knowing who to believe, Jeanette Turner looks like she is hiding something. 

Episodes alternate between Jeanette and Kate's viewpoint.

Disclaimers appear before certain episodes, cautioning viewers about themes such as child grooming and domestic abuse.

Cast and characters

Main 

 Olivia Holt as Kate Wallis, a popular girl who goes missing without a trace
 Chiara Aurelia as Jeanette Turner, a nerdy girl who takes over Kate's life after her disappearance. Aurelia wore a disheveled short-haired wig during the 1995 part of the first season.
 Froy Gutierrez as Jamie Henson, Kate's, and later Jeanette's, boyfriend
 Harley Quinn Smith as Mallory Higgins, one of Jeanette's best friends before her newfound popularity, and later Kate's best friend
 Brooklyn Sudano as Angela Prescott, a bar owner and Greg's new girlfriend
 Blake Lee as Martin Harris, the new vice-principal of Skylin High School who held Kate captive
 Allius Barnes as Vince Fuller, one of Jeanette's best friends before her newfound popularity
 Nathaniel Ashton as Ben Hallowell, Jamie's best friend
 Michael Landes as Greg Turner, Jeanette and Derek's father, Cindy's ex-husband, and Angela's boyfriend

Recurring 

 Sarah Drew as Cindy Turner, Jeanette and Derek's mother and Greg's ex-wife
 Barrett Carnahan as Derek Turner, Jeanette's older brother and Cindy and Greg's son
 Nicole Bilderback as Denise, Jeanette's lawyer
 Andrea Anders as Joy Wallis, Kate's wealthy self-centered mother with a Southern accent
 Ben Cain as Rod Wallis, Joy's second husband and Kate's stepfather
 Jason Douglas as Nick Marshall, Kate's lawyer

Episodes

Production

Development
On September 25, 2019, Freeform gave Last Summer a pilot order. On January 17, 2020, Last Summer was picked to series. The series was created by Bert V. Royal who was also expected to executive produce alongside Jessica Biel, Michelle Purple, and Max Winkler who also directed the pilot. The production companies involved with the series are Entertainment One and Iron Ocean Productions. On May 18, 2020, Last Summer was retitled as Cruel Summer. On June 15, 2021, Freeform renewed the series for a second season. On July 6, 2021, it was reported that Royal has exited the series after the pilot after disagreements with a network executive. On April 21, 2022, Elle Triedman was named as the new showrunner for the second season, replacing Tia Napolitano who boarded the series after Royal left. However, Napolitano is set to remain as an executive producer. It was also reported that the series is an anthology series.

Casting
On November 13, 2019, Michael Landes, Brooklyn Sudano, Harley Quinn Smith, Chiara Aurelia, Mika Abdalla, Froy Gutierrez, Allius Barnes, Blake Lee, and Nathaniel Ashton were cast in series regular roles. By May 18, 2020, Olivia Holt had replaced Mika Abdalla. On October 30, 2020, Sarah Drew joined the cast in a recurring role. On March 11, 2021, Barrett Carnahan, Andrea Anders, Benjamin J. Cain, and Nicole Bilderback were cast in recurring roles. On April 21, 2022, Sadie Stanley, Eloise Payet, Griffin Gluck, KaDee Strickland, Lisa Yamada and Sean Blakemore joined the cast in starring roles while Paul Adelstein was cast in a recurring role for the second season. On April 27, 2022, Lexi Underwood joined the series, replacing Payet in a recasting. On May 6, 2022, Braeden De La Garza, Nile Bullock, and Jenna Lamb were cast in recurring capacities for the second season.

Music
Besides Wendy Melvoin and Lisa Coleman serving as the main composers, the series heavily relies on a 90's inspired soundtrack. The second episode notably makes use of the Cranberries song "Zombie".

Filming
The first season of Cruel Summer was filmed over six months in Dallas, Texas. The second season began filming on April 21, 2022, and concluded on September 7, 2022, in Richmond, British Columbia.

Broadcast
The series premiered on Freeform on April 20, 2021. The second season is set to screen its premiere at the ATX Television Festival in Austin, Texas, in June 2023. The second season is scheduled to premiere in mid-2023 on Freeform.

Reception

Critical response

Cruel Summer received generally positive reviews from critics. On Rotten Tomatoes, the series holds an approval rating of 94% based on 33 critic reviews, with an average rating of 7.8/10. The website's critics consensus states, "Though it may have a bit too much going on, Cruel Summer delicious twists and delightful turns from its young stars are never less than entertaining." On Metacritic, it has a weighted average score of 74 out of 100 based on 15 critic reviews, indicating "generally favorable reviews".

Saloni Gajjar of The A.V. Club gave the series a B and wrote, "Cruel Summer manages to overcome its convoluted storytelling because it finds interesting, grounded ways to explore the impact of society's expectations of these young girls, and how their town and own families contribute to the pressure they face."

Ratings
On April 30, 2021, Cruel Summer was the most-watched overall series debut ever on Freeform with an average 3.81million total viewers across multi-platforms for its first week.

Accolades

Notes

References

External links

 

2020s American anthology television series
2020s American LGBT-related drama television series
2020s American teen drama television series
2021 American television series debuts
American thriller television series
English-language television shows
Freeform (TV channel) original programming
Kidnapping in television
Nonlinear narrative television series
Television series about missing people
Television series about teenagers
Television series by Entertainment One
Television series set in 1993
Television series set in 1994
Television series set in 1995
Television shows set in Texas